Watson Chapel Academy, better known as Chapel Academy (CA) was a private school in the Watson Chapel neighborhood of Pine Bluff, Arkansas. It was founded in 1971 as a segregation academy, which provided a means for white parents to keep their children from attending integrated public schools.

History
Chapel Academy opened in 1971 with 199 students, along with nearby Jefferson Prep as one of two segregated alternatives to integrated public schools. The school was a member of Mid-South Association of Non-Public Schools, which primarily sponsored athletics. Chapel Academy closed in 1985.

Notable people
Tim Storm, professional wrestler

References

Private high schools in Arkansas
Private middle schools in Arkansas
Private elementary schools in Arkansas
Preparatory schools in Arkansas
Segregation academies in Arkansas
Educational institutions established in 1971
1971 establishments in Arkansas
Educational institutions disestablished in 1985
1985 disestablishments in Arkansas
Defunct schools in Arkansas
Schools in Pine Bluff, Arkansas